The A. W. Mellon Lectures in the Fine Arts is an annual public lecture series, hosted by the National Gallery of Art in Washington, D.C., based on topics in the fine arts. Established in 1949 from an endowed gift from Ailsa Mellon Bruce and her brother, Paul Mellon, the series held its first lecture in 1952. While the series has featured mainly art historians, artists, composers, journalists, musicologists, poets, and scientists have also been invited to speak on art-related topics.

History
Established in 1949, the Mellon Lectures in the Fine Arts were created as part of an endowed gift to the National Gallery of Art from the Avalon Foundation and the Old Dominion Foundation, ran respectively by Ailsa Mellon Bruce and her brother, Paul Mellon, of the wealthy Mellon family. The series was created in order to "to bring to the people of the United States the results of the best contemporary thought and scholarship bearing upon the subject of the Fine Arts," and speakers must be of "exceptional ability, achievement, and reputation." The production of a book based on the talks has been funded by the Bollingen Foundation, ran by Paul and his wife, Mary Conover.

The Mellon Lectures began in 1952. Its first speaker was the French philosopher Jacques Maritain of Princeton University, who gave a talk titled "Creative Intuition in Art and Poetry."

Since 1967, the Princeton University Press has published the book based on each talk. In 1969, the foundations merged to form the Andrew W. Mellon Foundation.

In 1987, the Mellon Lecture did not take place for the first time since its inception. It restarted a year later, with 2020 being the only other stoppage. In that year, the French art historian Yve-Alain Bois was named as the annual speaker, but the event was postponed for a later date. Again, the series would restart in the following year.

Speakers

See also
List of public lecture series

Further reading
Cropper, Elizabeth, ed., The A. W. Mellon Lectures in the Fine Arts: Fifty Years, National Gallery of Art, 2002

References

External links
Official website

Lecture series
National Gallery of Art
Art education organizations
Mellon family